Hapoel Afula is a basketball club based in Afula, Israel. It currently plays in the Israeli National League.

History
The club was established in 1968, and was a member of the top division during the 1970s and 1980s. A decline saw the club merge with Hapoel Gilboa to form Hapoel Gilboa/Afula. The merged club played in the top division until 2008, when they were relegated after finishing bottom.

In June 2008 the merged club was disbanded, and Hapoel Afula became an independent club again (while Hapoel Gilboa would receive the top-division license of Hapoel Galil Elyon to form a new team, Hapoel Gilboa Galil). In their first season, Afula won the Liga Leumit play-off against Hapoel Lev HaSharon 3-1, and returned to the top division.

After one season, the group returned to the second division because the management could not arrange a suitable budget.

Roster

Notable players
  Maurice Joseph
  Jeff Allen
  David Ancrum
 Jimmy Hall (born 1994)

References

Afula
Basketball teams established in 1968
Afula
Liga Leumit (basketball) teams
Former Israeli Basketball Premier League teams